Edale  is a village and civil parish in the Peak District, Derbyshire, England, whose population was 353 at the 2011 Census. Edale, with an
is in the Borough of High Peak.

Edale is best known to walkers as the start, or southern end, of the Pennine Way and, to less ambitious walkers, as a starting point for evening or day walks. The village is accessible by generally hourly railway services from Sheffield and Manchester. There are two pubs serving real ale and food.

History
As spelt, the name is first recorded in 1732. Earlier recorded versions of the name are Aidele (1086), Heydale (1251), Eydale (1275), Eydal (1285) and Edall (1550).

Historically, Edale was the name of the valley of the River Noe. From the Norman Conquest of England it was in the royal Forest of High Peak and at its centre is the Edale Cross, which marked the boundary of the three wards at the Forest, Campana, Hopedale and Longdendale. Settlement in the valley consists of several booths, originally established in the 13th century as 'vaccaries' (cattle farms) along the valley of the River Noe, which have since developed into the hamlets of Upper Booth (once Crowdenley Booth and Over Booth), Barber Booth (once Whitmorely Booth), Grindsbrook Booth, Ollerbrook Booth and Nether Booth (also known as Lady Booth and, formerly, Lower Booth).

Cotton mill
Edale is the site of a historic cotton mill built in 1795 on the site of a corn mill and tannery by Nicholas Cresswell in partnership with James Harrison, Robert Blackwell and Joseph Fletcher. Workers were brought in from the towns and accommodated in cottages and in a nearby house called Skinner's Hall. Many of the women workers walked each day from Castleton over the thousand-foot Hollins Cross pass. The mill continued spinning cotton until around 1940 but then fell into disuse. It was restored in the early 1970s by the Landmark Trust who have since sold off all of the apartments.

Countryside
As well as being the start of the Pennine Way (the official start is the Old Nag's Head, a former smithy dating back to 1577), the village is surrounded by walking country which is excellent in its own right. The village lies in the Vale of Edale and is surrounded by hills: the plateau of Kinder Scout to the north, where the highest point in the parish is found, the Great Ridge (running west to east between Rushup Edge over Mam Tor to Lose Hill) to the south and east, Win Hill to the east (outside the parish), and Dalehead (Brown Knoll, Horsehill Tor and Colborne) to the west. Almost the entire parish is over 200m above sea level; only along the River Noe east from Carr House does the elevation drop below this level.

The bed and banks of the River Noe from Barber Booth upstream to approximately the  contour constitute the Edale SSSI, cited for geological interest. The "important exposures" of the Edale Shales here contain fossils of technical interest.

Amenities
There is a youth hostel about a mile from the village centre, several B&Bs and both pubs also provide accommodation. The pubs also provide food and there are two cafés. 

In 2006, a new information and visitor centre was opened at Fieldhead; it was developed by the Moors for the Future partnership and is owned and operated by the Peak District National Park Authority. 

Edale is also a popular camping village, with two major campsites and numerous others in the surrounding area.

Transport
Edale railway station lies on the trans-Pennine Hope Valley line and receives a reasonably frequent service for such a rural area. The typical off-peak is one train an hour in both directions, with some gaps at certain times of the day, to Sheffield and to Manchester Piccadilly via Marple. Services are operated by Northern Trains.

The short but narrow, twisting and dead-end road to the village centre is not suitable for visitors' cars and parking in the village centre is almost impossible. However, there is a large pay-and-display car park near the village hall and parking for rail users at the railway station. Additional parking near the station is provided at busy times by the Parish Council.

Famous residents
Nicholas Cresswell (1750–1804), native farmer and diarist in America 1774–1777
Peter Cropper, violinist
Berlie Doherty
Anthony Favell
Bella Hardy
Frederick ('Fred') Heardman, British Empire Medal recipient
Mark Wallington

See also
Listed buildings in Edale

Gallery

Panorama

References

External links

Edale Information Edale.org.uk
Edale Village Hall and Playing Field
Edale Primary School

Civil parishes in Derbyshire
Towns and villages of the Peak District
Villages in Derbyshire
High Peak, Derbyshire